Auchi is a city in Edo State, Nigeria.

Auchi, a part of Etsako West Local Government Area of Edo State, serves as the Local Government headquarters. Other towns in the Etsako West local government area include: Uzairue, South Ibie, Agbede and The Anwain Clan. During the British colonial rule, it was the headquarters of the Kukuruku Division, the administrative headquarters of five districts. It is the home of Auchi Polytechnic.

Former UFC Welterweight Champion Kamaru Usman and former Minister of information and culture Tony Momoh, Jeffrey Obomeghie, Nigerian-American executive and writer, and Apostle Johnson Suleman were born in Auchi.

Language 
The language spoken by the Auchi people is 'Yekhè' or Etsako amongst the Afenmai language. It is an Edoid language dialect or variant.

History 

There are varied historical accounts relating to the origins of the Auchi people. The most popular of these legends asserts that a mass migration from Udo in present-day Benin City led by a man called Uchi accompanied by his family and followers headed north and finally settled for the relative calm of the Guinea Savannah belt known today as Etsako land. This migration is believed to have taken place in the mid-15th century, during the reign of Oba Ewuare of the Benin Kingdom. This period in the Benin empire was characterised by constant wars and incessant strife.

Geography 
 

Auchi town is divided into five grand quarters which could also be referred to as districts; these are in turn made up of 25 villages.

The five grand quarters are:
 UTSOGUN
 AKPEKPE
 AIBOTSE
 IGBHEI
 IYEKHEI
In recent times, 24 extra villages have been created

Religion 
Auchi has been a major Islamic town.Oba Momodu was the first  person to embraced Islam in the area, and also the dynamic king of the kingdom and passed on 1944, Auchi followed quickly in the wake of his action.  The city is increasingly becoming Christian with the presence of the headquarter Church of Omega Fire Ministries. The head pastor ,Apostle Prof. Johnson Suleman is a major in the region. The people live peacefully. The welcoming and hospitable nature of the Auchi people has to a very large extent contributed to the cultural and religious diversity of the town.

Population 
The population grew to 42,638 by 1952, including people from many Nigerian tribes.

As of 1995, its population was 140,612. As of 2005–2006, currently, the population is about 150,000 persons.
Auchi has in recent years been amongst the fastest growing cities in Nigeria.

Culture and traditions 
Auchi Kingdom is headed by a monarchy and the traditional ruler is referred to as the Otaru of Auchi. The 8th of January is designated as Auchi Day. This commemorative day was previously called Uchi Day.

List of Otarus (traditional kings) 

 Alhaji Aliru H. Momoh (Ikelebe III) 10th Otaru of Auchi (1996 -)
 Alhaji Ahmed Guruza Momoh, the 9th Otaru of Auchi (1973 - 1996)
 Abubakar Keremi Momoh, The 8th Otaru of Auchi (1955 - 1970)
 King Momoh Jimah Momoh, the 7th Otaru of Auchi (1945 - 1955)
 King Momoh Idaeo, the 6th Otaru of Auchi (1919 - 1944)
 King Ikharo Ikelebe, the 5th Otaru of Auchi (1905 - 1919)
 Odifili, the 4th Otaru of Auchi (1905)
 Idaeo Ikelebe, the 3rd Otaru of Auchi (1884 - 1905)
 Imoudu Iburogamhe, the 2nd Otaru of Auchi (1872-1884)
 Ikelebe the first, 1st Otaru of Auchi (1819 - 1861)

Institutions and infrastructure 
Auchi is home to:

 Auchi Polytechnic
 Nigerian Army School of Electrical and Mechanical Engineering 
 Edo Fertilizer Milling Plant (commenced operation in June 2017)

Erosion 

Some parts of Auchi have been seriously devastated due to soil erosion. The Federal Government of Nigeria through the Nigeria Erosion and Watershed Management Project (NEWMAP), assisted by the World Bank, are now tackling the menace and are making fast progress.

Gallery

References

External links 

 
 http://www.afemaipeople.com/
 http://stanwilly.blogspot.co.uk/2012/01/etsako-people-of-nigeria-history-and.html
 http://ihuanedo.ning.com/profiles/blogs/the-real-story-of-auchi-town
 http://auchipoly.edu.ng

Populated places in Edo State